There are 166 international schools in Thailand as of June 2016, according to the Office of the Private Education Commission (OPEC), which regulates the operation of all private schools in the country. This is a comprehensive list, sorted by province, then alphabetically.

OPEC-regulated schools

Other schools
A few other international schools operate outside the purview of the OPEC. These include:
Siam Singapore International School, Bangkok, operated as a department of Valaya Alongkorn Rajabhat University.
Mahidol University International Demonstration School, Nakhon Pathom, operated as a department of Mahidol University.

See also

Education in Thailand
International Schools Association of Thailand
List of international schools
List of schools in Thailand

References

 
International Schools
Thailand